David Harold Braxton  (born May 25, 1965) is a former American football linebacker who played in the National Football League for the Minnesota Vikings, Phoenix Cardinals and Cincinnati Bengals. Braxton attended Wake Forest.

References

American football linebackers
Wake Forest Demon Deacons football players
Minnesota Vikings players
Phoenix Cardinals players
Cincinnati Bengals players
Living people
1965 births